Lifeline is a studio album by Roy Ayers Ubiquity. It was released in 1977 through Polydor Records. Recording sessions for the album took place at Sigma Sound Studios and Electric Lady Studios in New York City, and at Record Plant in Los Angeles. Production was handled by Ayers himself with co-production by Edwin Birdsong and William Allen. The album features contributions from singers Dee Dee Bridgewater and Sylvia Cox, keyboardist Philip Woo, guitarists Calvin Banks, Chuck Anthony, Glenn Jeffrey and James Mason, drummer Steve Cobb, percussionist Chano O'Ferral, saxophonist Justo Almario, and trumpeter John Mosley.

The album peaked at number 72 on the Billboard 200 albums chart and at number 9 on the Top R&B/Hip-Hop Albums chart in the United States. Its lead single, "Running Away", reached peak position No. 19 on the Hot R&B/Hip-Hop Songs chart.

Track listing

Personnel 
Roy Ayers Ubiquity
 Roy Ayers – vocals, vibraphone, electric piano, Deagan vibraharp, arrangement (tracks: 2–7, 9–10), producer
 Edwin L. Birdsong – vocals, piano, arrangement (track 8), co-producer
 William Henry Allen – bass, arrangement (track 1), co-producer
 Dee Dee Bridgewater – vocals
 Sylvia Cox – vocals
 Philip Woo – Moog synthesizer, ARP String Synthesizer, electric piano, piano
 Chuck Anthony – guitar
 Calvin Banks – guitar
 Glenn S. Jeffrey – guitar
 James Philip Mason – guitar
 Kwame Steve Cobb – drums
 Chano O'Ferral – congas, percussion
 Justo Almario – tenor saxophone
 John Clifford Mosley, Jr. – trumpet
Technical
 Michael Hutchinson – engineering
 David Wittman – engineering
 Bruce Hensal – engineering
 Jerry Solomon – engineering
 James Patrick Green – engineering
 Basil Pao Ho-Yun – art direction
 Kathie McKinty – photography

Chart history

References

External links 

1977 albums
Roy Ayers albums
Polydor Records albums
Albums produced by Roy Ayers